Malabar Cements Limited is an Indian cement company. It is among the largest public sector cement production undertakings. It is fully owned by the Government of Kerala and is the only major integrated cement plant in the State. The total installed capacity of MCL is 6.2 lakh tons. This ISO 9001:2000 company is responsible for about 10% of total cement production in Kerala.

History 
In 1961-62, the Geological Survey of India located a limestone deposit in the Pandarethu valley of the Walayar region on the northern side of the Palakkad gap. Located in a dense forest, the hilly terrain required heavy investment. The state government was interested in building a cement factory. In 1975 a feasibility study was completed. In 1976 an industrial license for the manufacture of cement was obtained.

The Company was incorporated on 11 April 1978 and commenced cement production at its Walayar plant in April 1984.

An expansion program added a 2.0 lakh ton clinker-grinding unit at Cherthala in Alappuzha district in August 2003.

A 2.5MW multi-fuel power plant for Walayar was commissioned in June 1998.

Development of the Cherthala plant began in August 2003 as part of an expansion plan by the company that included commissioning a 600 tpd Grinding Unit.

Plant 
The total installed capacity of MCL is 8.6 lakh tons.

Walayar plant
With a production capacity of 6.6 lakh tonnes of cement per annum, this unit is its largest one.

Cherthala plant
This plant includes a 600 tpd Grinding Unit. A two lakhs tonnes clinker grinding unit is there.

Corruption case
ARK Woods and Metals Ltd., entered into a contract with MCL, for fly ash for a period of nine years. MCL chose to cancel the contract. As a result, MCL incurred a loss of 52.5 lakh. Company managing director K. Padmakumar and marketing manager G. Venugopal were arrested by the VACB on charges of corruption and malpractice.

In 2007, the Comptroller and Auditor General unearthed a scam of Rs 400 crore. Saseendran was the prime witness. Two years later, he wrote to the Chief Minister and Vigilance department head informing them about the corruption. Following intimidation he resigned and two days after a charge sheet was filed in the case, Saseendran was found dead. The accused in his death were then Industries Minister Elamaram Kareem and then Managing Director Sundara Moorthy and his secretary Sooryanarayanan, VM Radhakrishnan, a private contractor with MCL.

References

External links 
 

Cement companies of India
Indian companies established in 1978
Companies based in Kerala
1978 establishments in Kerala
Government-owned companies of Kerala